The 65th Bodil Awards were held on 3 March 2012 in the Bremen Theater in Copenhagen, Denmark, honouring the best national and foreign films of 2010. Lars von Trier's Melancholia won the awards for Best Danish Film and Best Cinematography (Alberto Claro). The only other multiple winner was A Funny Man, which took the awards for Best Actor (Nikolaj Lie Kaas), Best Supporting Actor (Lars Ranthe) and Best Set Design (Charlotte Bay Garnov and Peter Grant). It also won the new Audience Award which was introduced this year in collaboration with Blockbuster. The awards for Best Leading and Supporting Actresses went to Lena Maria Christensen won the award for Best Actress for her performance in A Family and Paprika Steen won Best Supporting Actress for SuperClásico. Testamentet directed by Christian Sønderby Jepsen earned the award for Best Documentary. Winter's Bone was named Best American Film while the Iranian A Separation was selected as Best Non-American Film.

The actress Ghita Nørby received a Bodil Honorary Award and the producer Jes Graversen received a Special Award.

Winners

Best Danish Film 
 Melancholia
 A Family
 A Funny Man
 Rebounce
 SuperClásico

Best Documentary 
 The Testament
 Ambassadøren
 Svend
 ½ Revolution
 Præsidenteno

Best Actor in a Leading Role 
 Nikolaj Lie Kaas – A Funny Man
 Jesper Christensen – A Family
 Anders W. Berthelsen – SuperClásico

Best Actress in a Leading Role 
 Lena Maria Christensen – A Family
 Frederikke Dahl Hansen – Rebounce
 Kirsten Dunst – Melancholia
 Malou Reymann – Love Is in the Air

Best Actor in a Supporting Role 
 Lars Ranthe – A Funny Man
 Pilou Asbæk – A Family
 David Dencik – Room 304
 John Hurt – Melancholia
 Kiefer Sutherland – Melancholia

Best Actress in a Supporting Role 
Paprika Steen – SuperClásico
 Anne Sofie Espersen – Rebounce
 Charlotte Gainsbourg – Melancholia
 Anne Louise Hassing – A Family
 Charlotte Rampling – Melancholia

Best Cinematography 
 Manuel Alberto Claro – Melancholia' Best American Film 
 Winter's Bone Drive Black Swan True Grit Tree of Life Best Non-American Film 
 A Separation Another Year Of Gods and Men
 Oslo, August 31st The King's Speech Bodil Special Award 
 Jes Graversen (film distributor,  Miracle Film)

 Bodil Honorary Award 
 Ghita Nørby

 Audience Award 
 A Funny Man (actress)

 Henning Bahs Award 
 Charlotte Garnov and Peter Grant, scenography (A Funny Man'')

See also 

 2012 Robert Awards

References 

2011 film awards
Bodil Awards ceremonies
2012 in Copenhagen
March 2012 events in Europe